Christopher Blake (born 13 June 1953) is an Australian archer. He competed at the 1984 Summer Olympics and the 1988 Summer Olympics.

References

1953 births
Living people
Australian male archers
Olympic archers of Australia
Archers at the 1984 Summer Olympics
Archers at the 1988 Summer Olympics
Place of birth missing (living people)